Enrico Brignano (born  18 May 1966) is an Italian actor, playwright, comedian, presenter and writer.

Life and career 
Born in Rome, Brignano  graduated in 1990 at the Laboratory of Performing Exercises under Gigi Proietti, who later chose him for several of his play between 1994 and 1997 and as a sidekick in the TV-series Il maresciallo Rocca. After appearing as a comedian in several variety shows, he had his breakout with the role of Giacinto in Un medico in famiglia. Mainly active on stage, he played a number of main roles in TV-series and films, and in 2000 he directed, wrote and starred in the romantic comedy Si fa presto a dire amore.

Filmography

Films

Television

References

External links 
 

 

1966 births
Italian male stage actors
Italian male film actors
Italian male television actors
Italian film directors
Italian male screenwriters
Male actors from Rome
Living people
Italian male comedians
Italian television presenters
People of Sicilian descent
Mass media people from Rome
20th-century Italian male actors
21st-century Italian male actors
20th-century Italian comedians
21st-century Italian comedians
20th-century Italian screenwriters
21st-century Italian screenwriters